General elections were held in Spanish Guinea on 22 September 1968 to elect a President and National Assembly that would lead the country when it gained independence as Equatorial Guinea later that year. A second round of the presidential election was held on 29 September.

Francisco Macías Nguema of the Popular Idea of Equatorial Guinea led the field in the first round, advancing to a runoff with Prime Minister Bonifacio Ondó Edu. With the endorsement of eliminated candidates Atanasio Ndongo and Edmundo Bossio, Macías Nguema defeated Edu in the runoff. Edu's National Unity Movement of Equatorial Guinea and Ndongo's National Liberation Movement of Equatorial Guinea won ten seats each in the National Assembly, while the Popular Idea won eight.  Voter turnout was 67 percent in the first round and 79 percent in the second round.

After Macias Nguema's victory, he appointed Ndongo as Equatorial Guinea's first Foreign Minister and Bossio as Vice-President, while he ordered Edu's execution shortly after independence. To date, it has been the only free election ever held in Equatorial Guinea. Over the next four years, Macias Nguema consolidated his power step by step; in 1970 he set up the United National Workers' Party as the only legally permitted party in the country and by 1972 he had declared himself President for Life with dictatorial powers. As a result, the 1968 elections would be the last contested elections held in the country until 1993.

Results

President

National Assembly

Elected members

Alfredo King Tomas
Ángel Etugu Oguono
Antonio Eworo Obama
Antonio Ndongo
Armando Balboa
Clemente Ateba Nso
Cristina Makoli
Cristóbal Ondó Alogo
Domicilio Sila
Enrique Ncuna Ndongo
Federico Makendengue Eouabo
Gaspar Copariate Burkbake
Gustavo Watson Buebake
Juan Bestue
Juan Nguema
Julio Ngundi Nadjaba
Lorenza Matute
Manuel Gerona Hombria
Manuel Nguema Obono
Marcelino Ngale Econo
Marcelo Epám Uri
Mariano Ganet Bokuo
Mariano Mba Michá
Martín Esono Ndongo
Maximiliano Michá
Primo José Escono Micá
Raimundo Ela Nvé
Ramon Itanguino Elambani
Ricardo Bolopá Esape
Roberto Jora
Salvador Boleko Ripole
Saturnino Ibongo  Ivanga
Sebastián Oburu Masie
Pastor Torao Sikara
Salvador Nsamio Nsema

References

Spanish Guinea
1968 in Equatorial Guinea
Elections in Equatorial Guinea
Presidential elections in Equatorial Guinea
Election and referendum articles with incomplete results
September 1968 events in Africa